Chlosyne gabbii, or Gabb's checkerspot, is a butterfly from the family Nymphalidae.

Subspecies
 Chlosyne gabbii gabbii
 Chlosyne gabbii atrifasciata Emmel & Mattoon, 1998

Description
The upperside of the wings is checkered with bright orange-brown and black, while the underside of hindwing shows pearly-white spots. Females are lighter than the males. Adults can be encountered from May to July.

Larvae feed  on Corethrogyne filaginifolia, Heterotheca grandiflora and Haplopappus squarrosus.

Distribution
This very rare species can be found in California in the western United States. It is threatened throughout its range.

References

External links
 Butterflies of America

Butterflies described in 1863
gabbii
Butterflies of North America
Taxa named by Hans Hermann Behr